Silver Stallion (lit. "The Silver Stallion Will Never Come") is a 1991 South Korean film based on the novel by Ahn Jung-hyo.

Synopsis
Soldiers with the U.N. forces that entered Korea during the Korean War rape a village girl named Eon-rae. The villagers ostracize Eon-rae and her son. Unable to make a living, Eon-rae joins the brothel district that has been set up near the U.N. base on the other side of the river from the village. The war and the introduction of U.S. culture break down the social order of the village. After several village children have died, the villagers put the blame on the prostitutes. Eventually the villagers, unable to maintain the village, leave their homes one by one. Eon-rae and her son also leave.

Cast
 Lee Hye-sook... Eon-rae
 Kim Bo-yeon... Yong-nyeo
 Jeon Moo-song... Hwang Hun-jang
 Son Chang-min... Seok-gu
 Yang Taek-jo... Lee Jang
 Bang Eun-hee... Soon-deok
 Lee Dae-ro... Chan Dol-bu
 Kim Hyeong-ja... Chan Dol-mo
 Lee Ki-young... Kang Ho-bu
 Hong Yun-jeong... Kang Ho-mo

Awards
Montréal World Film Festival (1991)
 Best Actress: Lee Hye-sook
 Best Screenplay: Jang Kil-su, Cho Jai-hong

Baeksang Arts Awards (1991)
 Best Film
 Best Actress: Lee Hye-sook

Korean Association of Film Critics Awards (1991)
 Best Actress: Lee Hye-sook

Blue Dragon Film Awards (1991)
 Best Director: Jang Kil-su
 Best Supporting Actress: Kim Bo-yeon

Notes

Bibliography

External links
 
 

1991 films
1990s Korean-language films
South Korean war drama films
Korean War films